Chabab Aurès de Batna, known as CA Batna or CAB for short, is an Algerian football club based in Batna, founded in 1932. The club colours are red and blue. Their home stadium, Stade 1er Novembre 1954 (Batna), has a capacity of 20,000 spectators. The club is currently playing the Algerian Ligue 2.

On 5 August 2020, CA Batna promoted to the Algerian Ligue 2.

Honours
Algerian Cup
Runners-up (2): 1997, 2010

Algerian League Cup
Runners-up (1): 1998

Performance in CAF competitions
CAF Confederation Cup: 1 appearance
2011 – Preliminary Round

Current squad

Former players
For a complete list of former players, see:

Managers
 Ameur Djamil (1 July 2011 – 20 Feb 2012)
 Toufik Rouabah (29 Feb 2012 – 30 June 2012)
 Rachid Bouarrata (1 July 2012 – 10 Oct 2012)
 Toufik Rouabah (12 Oct 2012 – 1 Jan 2013)
 Ali Fergani (5 Jan 2013–)

References

External links

Info about CA Batna
SportListings.com – CA Batna

 
Football clubs in Algeria
CA Batna
Association football clubs established in 1932
Algerian Ligue Professionnelle 1 clubs
Algerian Ligue 2 clubs
1932 establishments in Algeria
Sports clubs in Algeria
Batna, Algeria